Israel is widely believed to possess weapons of mass destruction, and to be one of four nuclear-armed countries not recognized as a Nuclear Weapons State by the Non-Proliferation Treaty (NPT). The US Congress Office of Technology Assessment has recorded Israel as a country generally reported as having undeclared chemical warfare capabilities, and an offensive biological warfare program. Officially, Israel neither confirms nor denies possessing nuclear weapons.

Nuclear weapons

It is believed that Israel had possessed an operational nuclear weapons capability by 1967, with the mass production of nuclear warheads occurring immediately after the Six-Day War. Experts estimated the stockpile of Israeli nuclear weapons range from 60 to as many as 400.  It is unknown if Israel's reported thermonuclear weapons are in the megaton range.  Israel is also reported to possess a wide range of different systems, including neutron bombs, tactical nuclear weapons, and suitcase nukes. Israel is believed to manufacture its nuclear weapons at the Negev Nuclear Research Center.

Nuclear weapons delivery 

Nuclear weapons delivery mechanisms include Jericho 3 missiles, with a range of 4,800 km to 6,500 km (though a 2004 source estimated its range at up to 11,500 km), and which are believed to provide a second-strike option, as well as regional coverage from road mobile Jericho 2 IRBMs. Israel's nuclear-capable ballistic missiles are believed to be buried so far underground that they would survive a nuclear attack. Additionally, Israel is believed to have an offshore nuclear second-strike capability, using submarine-launched nuclear-capable cruise missiles, which can be launched from the Israeli Navy's Dolphin-class submarines. The Israeli Air Force has F-15I and F-16I Sufa fighter aircraft which are capable of delivering tactical and strategic nuclear weapons at long distances using conformal fuel tanks and supported by their aerial refueling fleet of modified Boeing 707s.

In 2006, then Israeli Prime Minister Ehud Olmert appeared to acknowledge that Israel had nuclear weapons when he stated on German TV that Iran was "aspiring to have nuclear weapons as America, France, Israel, Russia". This admission was in contrast to the long-running Israeli government policy of deliberate ambiguity on whether it has nuclear weapons. The policy held that Israel would "not be the first to introduce nuclear weapons in the Middle East." Former International Atomic Energy Agency Director General Mohamed ElBaradei regarded Israel as a state possessing nuclear weapons.  Much of what is known about Israel's nuclear program comes from revelations in 1986 by Mordechai Vanunu, a technician at the Negev Nuclear Research Center who served an 18-year prison sentence as a result. Israel has not signed the Non-Proliferation Treaty (NPT), but supports establishment of a Middle East Zone free of weapons of mass destruction.

Chemical weapons

Israel has signed but not ratified the Chemical Weapons Convention (CWC).  In 1983 a report by the CIA stated that Israel, after "finding itself surrounded by frontline Arab states with budding CW capabilities, became increasingly conscious of its vulnerability to chemical attack... undertook a program of chemical warfare preparations in both offensive and protective areas... In late 1982 a probable CW nerve agent production facility and a storage facility were identified at the Dimona Sensitive Storage Area in the Negev Desert. Other CW agent production is believed to exist within a well-developed Israeli chemical industry."

There are also speculations that a chemical weapons program might be located at the Israel Institute for Biological Research (IIBR) in Ness Ziona.

190 liters of dimethyl methylphosphonate, a CWC schedule 2 chemical used in the synthesis of sarin nerve gas, was discovered in the cargo of El Al Flight 1862 after it crashed in 1992 en route to Tel Aviv. Israel said the material was non-toxic, and was to have been used to test filters that protect against chemical weapons. It had also been clearly listed on the cargo manifest in accordance with international regulations. The shipment was from a U.S. chemical plant to the IIBR under a U.S. Department of Commerce license.

In 1993, the U.S. Congress Office of Technology Assessment WMD proliferation assessment recorded Israel as a country generally reported as having undeclared offensive chemical warfare capabilities. Former US deputy assistant secretary of defense responsible for chemical and biological defense Dr. Bill Richardson said in 1998 "I have no doubt that Israel has worked on both chemical and biological offensive things for a long time... There's no doubt they've had stuff for years."

Biological weapons
Israel is suspected to have developed an offensive biological warfare capability, per the US Congress Office of Technology Assessment. Israel is not a signatory to the Biological Weapons Convention (BWC).  It is assumed that the Israel Institute for Biological Research in Ness Ziona develops vaccines and antidotes for chemical and biological warfare. It is generally agreed Israel does not have a stockpile of chemical weapons; it is speculated that Israel retains an active ability to produce and disseminate biological weapons, likely as a result of its extremely complex biodefense program. Israel has taken steps to strengthen its export control regulations on dual-use biotechnologies.

References

External links
 .
Israeli Nuclear History, Archival Document Collection at the Wilson Center Digital Archive
 Avner Cohen Collection at the Wilson Center's Nuclear Proliferation International History Project
 Israel Crosses the Threshold, National Security Archive Electronic Briefing Book No. 189, by Avner Cohen and William Burr, April 28, 2006 (originally published at "Israel crosses the threshold", Bulletin of the Atomic Scientists, May/June 2006])
Bibliography of Israeli Nuclear Science Publications by Mark Gorwitz, June 2005
Israeli Nuclear Forces, 2002, Bulletin of the Atomic Scientists, September/October 2002
"The Bomb That Never Is", by Avner Cohen, Bulletin of the Atomic Scientists, May/June 2000, Vol. 56, No. 3 pp. 22–23
 Israel and the Bomb (online; Columbia University Press, 1998), including declassified documents.
"Obsessive secrecy undermines democracy" by Reuven Pedatzur. Ha'aretz. Tuesday, August 8, 2000—Cohen published Israel and the Bomb in the United States, and a Hebrew translation of the book has appeared here. In the eyes of the defense establishment, Cohen has committed a double sin.
Fighting to preserve the tattered veil of secrecy by Ronen Bergman. The publication of Dr. Avner Cohen's book and of the Vanunu trial transcripts set off alarm bells for the Defense Ministry's chief of security, who is striving to protect the traditional opacity regarding Israel's nuclear affairs.
"Blast, from the past to the present" by Yirmiyahu Yovel. Ha'aretz,. July 28, 2000. If, in the context of the peace agreements and talks with the United States, Israel were to confirm its nuclear capability - while committing itself to no nuclear testing and pledging to build its defense system on conventional weapons as in the past - maybe then it might achieve at least de facto recognition, if not international legitimacy, for its nuclear weaponry, to be used only as a "last resort" and a tool for safeguarding peace after Israel withdraws.
The Third Temple's Holy of Holies: Israel's Nuclear Weapons Warner D. Farr, LTC, U.S. Army, September 1999
"Israel: Plutonium Production". The Risk Report, Volume 2 Number 4 (July–August 1996).
"Israel: Uranium Processing and Enrichment". The Risk Report, Volume 2 Number 4 (July–August 1996).
Israel The Nuclear Potential of Individual Countries Treaty on Nonproliferation of Nuclear Weapons Problems of Extension Appendix 2 Russian Federation Foreign Intelligence Service April 6, 1995
The Samson Option: Israel's Nuclear Arsenal and American Foreign Policy by Seymour M. Hersh, New York: Random House, 1991

Israeli nuclear development
Weapons of mass destruction, Israel
Israel

de:Israelische Massenvernichtungswaffen
es:Armas nucleares de Israel
fr:Programme nucléaire israélien
ms:Israel dan senjata pemusnahan meluas
tr:İsrail'in nükleer silahları